Callum William McCowatt (born 30 April 1999) is a New Zealand professional footballer who plays as a left winger for Danish 1st Division club FC Helsingør.

Club career
Following his graduation from Westlake Boys High School, McCowatt joined the Olé Football Academy in early 2015, playing league football for Olé-affiliated club Western Suburbs. During his time with the academy, McCowatt was named in the youth squad of Team Wellington for the 2016 National Youth League season.

Auckland City
Following his time at Western Suburbs, McCowatt moved to ISPS Handa Premiership club Auckland City along with fellow Olé graduates Dalton Wilkins and Owen Parker-Price on 26 September 2017. Though he was originally intended for the youth team, McCowatt eventually started every game Auckland City played that season, including the FIFA Club World Cup and OFC Champions League campaigns. McCowatt scored the only goal in the grand final as Auckland City defeated Team Wellington 1–0 to lift the league title.

Following McCowatt's success in his debut season, in which he formed an attacking trio with Ryan de Vries and Emiliano Tade, he earned a trial with Eredivisie club Sparta Rotterdam, but was not offered a contract.

Eastern Suburbs
On 21 November 2018, McCowatt continued his relationship with the Olé academy, signing with affiliated club Eastern Suburbs. He scored 21 goals in 16 appearances in the 2018–19 season, including a hat-trick in the grand final against Team Wellington which his team won 3–0. He was awarded the Steve Sumner Trophy for player of the match.

Wellington Phoenix
On 26 June 2019, it was announced that McCowatt signed with the Wellington Phoenix who play in the A-League on a one-year deal. McCowatt scored his first goal for the Phoenix in their FFA Cup lost to the Brisbane Strikers before he made his professional debut in a 0–1 loss to Western United in the Phoenix season opener.

FC Helsingør
On 6 September 2020, McCowatt signed a contract with FC Helsingør who play in the Danish 1st Division. On 18 October 2020, McCowatt made his debut for FC Helsingør, when he was substituted on in the 70th minute. McCowatt scored his first goal for the club against HB Køge in the Danish 1st Division promotion group match.

International career
McCowatt got his first international call up for the New Zealand U17 team for the 2015 FIFA U-17 World Cup. He played in four games with one start.
McCowatt was named in the New Zealand U20 squad for the 2019 FIFA U-20 World Cup. He made 3 starting appearances but was unable to score.

McCowatt made his international debut on 15 November 2019, starting for New Zealand in a friendly against Ireland. McCowatt scored his first goal for New Zealand opening the scoring of the game before going onto lose 1–3.

On 25 June 2021, McCowatt was called up to the Tokyo 2020 Olympics with the New Zealand U-23's.
He made his Olympics debut on 22 July 2021 in the OlyWhites first ever Olympic win, a 1-0 win against Korea Republic.

Career statistics

Club

International

Scores and results list New Zealand's goal tally first.

Honours
Auckland City
 New Zealand Football Championship Premiership: 2017–18
 New Zealand Football Championship Championship: 2017–18

Eastern Suburbs
 New Zealand Football Championship Championship: 2018–19

Individual
 League top-goalscorer: New Zealand Football Championship 2018–19
 Steve Sumner Trophy: 2017–18, 2018–19

References

External links

1999 births
Living people
New Zealand association footballers
New Zealand youth international footballers
New Zealand international footballers
New Zealand expatriate association footballers
Association football forwards
Wellington Phoenix FC players
A-League Men players
Western Suburbs FC (New Zealand) players
Auckland City FC players
Eastern Suburbs AFC players
FC Helsingør players
Danish 1st Division players
Footballers at the 2020 Summer Olympics
Olympic association footballers of New Zealand
New Zealand expatriate sportspeople in Denmark
Expatriate men's footballers in Denmark
New Zealand under-20 international footballers